USS Bristol has been the name of two ships of the United States Navy, named in honor of Rear Admiral Mark Lambert Bristol. 

 , a Gleaves-class destroyer commissioned in 1941 and sunk off Algeria in 1943
 , an Allen M. Sumner-class destroyer commissioned in 1945 and served until late 1969 after which it was then transferred to Taiwan

USS Bristol may also refer to:

 USS Arthur L. Bristol (DE-281), a United States Navy destroyer escort converted during construction into the high-speed transport 
 , a United States Navy high-speed transport in commission from 1945 to 1946

References
 

United States Navy ship names